Dzhambulat Olegovich Dulayev (born 18 October 1998) is a Russian football player who plays for FC Khimki.

Club career
He made his debut in the Russian Premier League for FC Khimki on 29 October 2022 in a game against FC Dynamo Moscow. Khimki scored their only goal in a 1–6 loss from a penalty kick awarded for a foul against Dulayev.

Career statistics

References

External links
 
 
 
 

1998 births
Living people
Russian footballers
Association football forwards
FC Spartak Vladikavkaz players
FC Rostov players
FC Mashuk-KMV Pyatigorsk players
FC Olimp-Dolgoprudny players
FC Khimki players
Russian Second League players
Russian First League players
Russian Premier League players